The Phantom Blooper: A Novel of Vietnam is a 1990 novel written by Gustav Hasford and the sequel to The Short-Timers (1979). It continues to follow James T. "Joker" Davis through his Vietnam odyssey. The book was supposed to be the second of a "Vietnam Trilogy", but Hasford died before writing the third installment.

Plot
The novel begins sometime after The Short-Timers leaves off and is divided into three parts.

"The Winter Soldiers"
Having been demoted from Sergeant to Private, Joker is still at the Khe Sanh base, which is about to be abandoned by American Marines after withstanding an extended siege by the North Vietnamese Army. He believes most of his previous squad-mates are dead, even the seemingly indestructible Animal Mother. Joker blames their deaths on "The Phantom Blooper": an elusive enemy, supposedly American and armed with an M79 grenade launcher, who fights alongside the Viet Cong against his countrymen.

Joker is still haunted by the memory of his friend Cowboy, who had been wounded and whom Joker mercy-killed in order to keep their squad from being cut down by a sniper. As a result, Joker's behavior has become increasingly erratic and violent. He sets up one of his squad-mates to be killed in an attempt to draw the Phantom Blooper out of hiding, then forces an inattentive Marine on guard duty to hold a live hand grenade with the pin out. Later, as the Viet Cong attempt to overrun the base, Joker splits his platoon sergeant's tongue with a straight razor.

The Marines turn back the attack, suffering heavy losses in the process. The next night, Joker ventures out in search of the Phantom Blooper, but is wounded by friendly fire and captured by the enemy.

"Travels with Charlie"
Joker has been living and working in a small Viet Cong village for over a year since his capture, waiting for a chance to escape. He has not been tortured or sent to a POW camp, and his captors have begun to trust him to some degree. In Joker's mind, his best chance is to fool them into believing he has converted to their cause, to accompany them on an attack against an American position, and then to make his escape when the shooting starts. As time passes, however, he begins to side increasingly with the Viet Cong, seeing them – the people he has been trained to kill – as ordinary human beings just like himself. When a team of Army soldiers arrives to rescue him, he is wounded in the ensuing firefight but manages to shoot down one of their choppers with a discarded M79 before passing out and being evacuated from the area.

"The Proud Flesh"
Joker is sent to Yokosuka Naval Hospital in Japan for medical treatment and psychological counseling. He quickly makes it clear that he does not regret any of his actions as a Viet Cong captive, and he expresses his disgust and outrage at having been sent by his country to fight in a futile war. Despite initial threats of a court-martial for treason, he is eventually given a Section 8 discharge and sent home to the United States.

Upon arriving in California, Joker finds that his squad radioman, Donlon, is alive, attending college, and protesting the war. He also learns that Animal Mother was captured by the Viet Cong, but escaped from a POW camp and has since returned to active duty. Joker and Donlon attend a demonstration that is quickly and forcefully broken up by the police, but Joker manages to slip away with the help of an ex-Marine cop who served with him at Khe Sanh. Next, Joker travels to Cowboy's home in Kansas, and has a brief and uneasy meeting with Cowboy's parents. Their son's body was never recovered from the jungle, and Joker chooses not to tell them that he mercy-killed Cowboy. Finally, Joker reaches his family's farm in Alabama, all the while feeling a growing disillusionment with the war and America. Deciding there is nothing left for him in the United States, and realizing that he has become the Phantom Blooper he was once obsessed with stopping, he sets out to return to Vietnam and his life among the Viet Cong villagers.

Reception
This sequel made less of an impact than The Short-Timers (1979), which was the basis for the film Full Metal Jacket (1987). (Some dialogue from The Phantom Blooper is also present in Full Metal Jacket.)  Nonetheless, The Phantom Blooper was highly regarded by reviewers. Before Hasford died in 1993, he had planned to continue Joker's story in a third novel.

Availability 
According to the Official Gustav Hasford Website maintained by Hasford's cousin, Jason Aaron, The Short-Timers, The Phantom Blooper: A Novel of Vietnam, and Hasford's third and last completed book, a noir detective novel titled A Gypsy Good Time (1992), are currently out of print. The texts of the two war novels and an excerpt of A Gypsy Good Time were publicly available at the website for at least a decade, but the site has since been redesigned, and Aaron, who manages the site, has stated he "likely won't be reposting the novel" there.

References

External links 
Original version of the Gustav Hasford home page, with the full text of The Short-Timers and The Phantom Blooper novels included

1990 American novels
American autobiographical novels
Novels set during the Vietnam War
Works about the United States Marine Corps